Terry King is an American poker player.

Terry King may also refer to:

Terry Lee King, 2001 murder victim in Florida, USA
Terry King, former member of American vocal group The Drifters

See also
Terrence King (disambiguation)